Minuscule 750 (in the Gregory-Aland numbering), ε1204 (von Soden), is a Greek minuscule manuscript of the New Testament written on parchment. Palaeographically it has been assigned to the 12th century. The manuscript has no complex contents. Scrivener labelled it as 742e.

Description 

The codex contains a complete text of the four Gospels on 319 parchment leaves (size ). The text is written in one column per page, 20 lines per page.

There is also another division according to the smaller Ammonian Sections (inMark 241 Sections, the last in 16:20), without references to the Eusebian Canons.

Text 

The Greek text of the codex is a representative of the Byzantine text-type. Aland placed it in Category V.

Hermann von Soden classified it to the textual family Kx. According to the Claremont Profile Method it belongs to the textual cluster M27 in Luke 1, Luke 10, and Luke 20. It creates a textual pari with 1222.

History 

Scrivener dated the manuscript to the 11th or 12th century; Gregory dated the manuscript to the 12th century. The manuscript is currently dated by the INTF to the 12th century.

It was added to the list of New Testament manuscripts by Scrivener (742) and Gregory (750). It was described by Paulin Martin. Gregory saw the manuscript in 1885.

The manuscript is now housed at the Bibliothèque nationale de France (Suppl. Gr. 914) in Paris.

See also 

 List of New Testament minuscules
 Biblical manuscript
 Textual criticism
 Minuscule 749

References

Further reading 

 
 Jean-Pierre-Paul Martin, Description technique des manuscrits grecs, relatif au Nouveau Testemant, conservé dans les bibliothèques des Paris (Paris 1883), p. 91

Greek New Testament minuscules
12th-century biblical manuscripts
Bibliothèque nationale de France collections